Husky was a brand name for a line of business die-cast toy scale model vehicles manufactured by Mettoy Playcraft Ltd. of Swansea, Wales, which also made the larger Corgi Toys. Husky Models was re-branded "Corgi Junior" in 1970, and a further range called "Corgi Rockets" was developed to race on track sets.

Husky
The Husky line, introduced in 1964, was designed to compete in size with the "1-75 series" Matchbox, which were the market leaders in small-scale toy vehicles at the time. Husky cars and trucks were inexpensive and originally sold only at Woolworth's stores at a price which undercut their rival.

The Husky line numbered about 75 vehicles at its peak, the same number as Matchbox, although unlike the Lesney product Huskys were sold in blister packs allowing the model to be clearly seen when on display. The original style of these blister cards featured a simplistic red and white design on the front with the range's logo - the head of a Husky dog featuring prominently, and a list of the models in the range printed as a tick-list on the rear. The design changed with the upgrading of the range in 1969 to a yellow, red and white colour scheme with the name "Husky" now featuring more prominently. Like Matchbox, they also offered accessory items for children, such as carrying/storage cases for the cars, and even catalogues in the late 1960s.  

Husky's original choices for vehicles were quite creative and included many models not seen before or since in miniature. British, French, German and American cars were all represented: a Citroën DS estate with a rowing boat on the roof, a Reliant 3 wheeler pickup, a 1959 Buick Electra, a rather odd Land Rover utility vehicle, a Reliant Scimitar, a Sunbeam Alpine, a 1966 Oldsmobile Starfire, and an NSU Ro-80 are some examples of the variety.

Some car brands, like the Studebaker Lark Wagonaire, were also produced by Matchbox at about the same time. Though different castings, one wonders at the story behind two competing British companies coming up with such similar choices - surely it wasn't chance. Both versions had the sliding rear roof panel, though the Husky's was clear plastic while the Matchbox's was metal. The tailgate of the Husky was plastic and came down. The Matchbox version came with a white plastic hunter aiming his rifle with pointer dog, but Husky arguably had the more creative choices, using that sliding roof panel to promotional advantage. One version was an ambulance with a plastic stretcher and another had a TV camera placed in that back section. Husky also produced their version in five different colours, whereas Matchbox only had two variations of one (a lighter turquoise and a darker one).

"Husky Majors" was a line of trucks mimicking the "Matchbox Major Packs" of virtually the same name. One offering in this line was Husky 2002, a Ford car carrier (transporter) truck with a Hoynor Mk. II trailer. Chocks on the trailer could be adjusted for different sized cars, and the rear gate could be lowered and the whole upper section of the trailer dropped to deposit cars to the tarmac. A separate gift pack offered this truck with five cars. Another truck in the series was a Husky moving van with "Husky" molded and brightly lettered in red on the sides.

The first models featured dark grey one-piece plastic wheels and chromed plastic bases. These cheaper bases made the models lighter and perhaps less durable than Matchbox cars. Still, their construction did allow for a simple suspension system to be installed by means of the axle being positioned to be sandwiched between the main base and a section of the plastic base which was cut away on three of sides to form a plastic tongue, which acted as a crude springing mechanism. In 1969 Mettoy re-designed and improved the quality of the models. Die cast metal bases, better suspension and two-piece separate hub and tyre wheels were fitted to upgrade existing models along with a variety of new models that were added to the range.

Corgi Juniors

By 1970 the exclusive marketing contract with Woolworth had come to an end and realising that the Husky range could now be sold alongside Matchbox in a variety of outlets the series was re-launched as Corgi Juniors to integrate it into the Corgi Toys family, and the existing Husky models now carried the new name. This was the first time the range had been branded as a Corgi product. Low friction all plastic Whizzwheels were also added to most of the models in 1970 to compete with Mattel's Hot Wheels and Lesney's Matchbox Superfast ranges, and they could be raced on the Corgi Rockets track systems.

Although small scale Corgi models would continue to be produced until the demise of the original company in 1983 the name Corgi Juniors was dropped in the mid 1970s and the models were just branded as Corgi.

Corgi Rockets  
The Corgi Rocket range first appeared in October 1969. Mettoy had taken the decision that merely competing against their rivals with high performing low friction models was not enough. To add more "play value" Corgi Rockets had die-cast metal bases that featured a central channel where a separate black nylon chassis, that also held the wheel and axle assembly, would fit. Despite the fact that the axles were somewhat thicker than their rivals, particularly Mattel’s Hot Wheels which used thin wire axles, the low friction properties of the nylon chassis in which the axle and wheel unit sat allowed Corgi Rockets to be the fastest on the track. The chassis could be removed using a "Golden Tune Up Key" - a gold coloured metal tool which was supplied with each model that featured a simple key at one end to unlock the chassis from the base of the model, and a tool at the other end to remove the axles from the chassis. As such, the models could be "tuned up" and the axles lubricated using a separately available "Rocketlube" lightweight oil dispenser in the form of a felt tip pen. The "Golden Tune Up Key" supplied with each model was also labeled with the name of the individual model.

Corgi Rockets had bright chrome-like finishes obtained by chrome electro-plating the body of the model and then coating the body in a clear coloured layer. The effect was similar to Hot Wheels "Spectraflame" finish.

Initially seven models were introduced, three of which (D901, D902, and D907) were adapted from the Husky range; while the remaining were new Corgi Junior designs. The initial models were:

 D901 Aston Martin DB6
 D902 Jaguar XJ6
 D903 Mercedes Benz 280SL
 D904 Porsche Carrera 6
 D905 The Saint's Volvo P1800
 D906 Jensen Interceptor
 D907  Cadillac Eldorado

All the models in the Corgi Rockets range also featured in the Corgi Juniors range. A Jaguar E-Type 2+2 was featured in both Corgi Juniors and Husky ranges, but the earlier Husky version was a different casting from the Corgi Juniors version, which also featured an opening bonnet. The Corgi Juniors range was priced to compete with Matchbox models while the Corgi Rockets range sold for a higher price comparable (in the UK) with Mattel's Hot Wheels. The Rockets range met with early success and was voted Boys' Toy of the Year for 1971 by British toy industry journal Toy Trader, yet the line would be gone in less than a year.

Corgi Rockets were sold in conjunction with a series of track sets which featured "autostarts", power boosters, covered mountain-style "hair-pin" bends, "space leaps", "superloops", an ingenious cable car and even a thirteen storey “Sky Park”. The range expanded rapidly and around 30 models were produced including a highly valuable James Bond 007 set featuring four models from the film "On Her Majesty's Secret Service" - a Mercury Cougar, an updated Mercedes Benz 280SL in "S.P.E.C.T.R.E" finish and a Ford Capri and Ford Escort in ice racing colour schemes.

It is suspected that losing a court case to Mattel (over a copyright claim by the American toy manufacturer to the sole production rights of associated tracks systems for their range of Hot Wheels cars) was the main reason for the failure of the range since the cars without tracks to race on had little purpose. Production of the track sets was halted immediately while stocks already in the shops were allowed to be sold. Sales of the Rockets cars suffered as a result and the costly-to-produce range was withdrawn at the end of 1971, after just over a year in production.

Legacy
The small scale models were produced by Mettoy as either Husky, Corgi Jr., Corgi Rockets or later simply Corgi until the company was declared insolvent in 1983. Corgi was purchased by Mattel in 1989 before being sold again in a management buyout in 1995.  During this time, models were sold in blister packs as the Corgi Auto-City line. Several of the Corgi Junior castings were later reissued as part of Mattel's Hot Wheels line, although most were rather plain and seemed unpopular with Hot Wheels collectors. Most were on sale for only a year or two. One model, the BMW 850i was offered in two castings by Mattel; the former Corgi Jr. and Mattel's own Hot Wheels version. The Corgi casting, with opening doors, was much better proportioned and more realistic. One Corgi casting lasted a bit longer as a Hot Wheels - the Porsche Carrera - which was reissued in a number of different colour schemes. This cast in particular can be seen on 1972 Corgi catalogues and received its Hot Wheels "Final Run" issue in 2002.

Today it is Corgi Rockets that have become most collectible, no doubt helped by their scarcity. However, the film and TV related models in the Husky range, such as the 1966 Batman series Batmobile, Chitty Chitty Bang Bang, The Man from U.N.C.L.E.' 'Piranha' car and the James Bond Aston Martin (though the smaller car produced was a DB6, not the DB5 seen in the larger Corgi Toys range) have realised surprisingly high prices in recent years. In 2009, an original manufacturer's trade box of six Husky James Bond DB6s was sold on eBay for US$1,300, and in January 2010 a Corgi Rockets James Bond "On Her Majesty's Secret Service" four-car set was sold on eBay for £3600, making it the most valuable of all Corgi branded products.

Today, the Corgi brand is owned by Hornby, and called Corgi International Limited. The company specializes in collectibles of various types including a range of 1/76 scale (00 scale) commercial vehicle models called Corgi Trackside.

In about 2005 the Husky name appeared attached to diecast emergency and commercial vehicles related to the tourism industry in the UK. An FX-2 taxi, a police car, a fire truck, and an ambulance appeared in the series. The company was based in Leicester and appears unconnected to modern Corgi.

References

External links 
Photos of some Husky models
Photos of Husky, Corgi Junior, and Corgi Rockets models, as well as Husky catalogs, blister cards, etc.
Husky Models on The Old Toy Guide

Defunct toy manufacturers
Toy cars and trucks
Toy brands
Die-cast toys